The First Parliament of the Province of Canada was summoned in 1841, following the union of Upper Canada and Lower Canada as the Province of Canada on February 10, 1841. The Parliament continued until dissolution in late 1844.

The Parliament of the Province had two chambers: the elected lower house, the Legislative Assembly, and the appointed upper house, the Legislative Council. The first general election for the Legislative Assembly was held in April, 1841.  Canada East (formerly Lower Canada) and Canada West (formerly Upper Canada)) each had forty-two seats in the Legislative Assembly.  The members of the Legislative Council, twenty-four in number, were appointed by the British Governor General, Lord Sydenham.

All sessions were held at Kingston, Canada West, with the first session of the Parliament called in June 1841. The Parliament had three annual sessions, but then was prorogued for close to a year due to a political crisis in the relations between the Legislative Assembly and the Governor General.  The Parliament was dissolved in September, 1844, triggering the second general election for the Province.

In 1841, the District Councils Act was passed which established a system of local government in Canada West based on district councils. Prior to 1841, local affairs were dealt with by the District Court of Quarter Sessions.

First government and election 

The Governor General, Lord Sydenham, appointed the first members to the Executive Council on February 13, 1841.  All of the members were anglophones, with no francophones.  They were appointed as advisors to the Governor General, who continued to exercise the executive powers of the government.

The first general election for the new Legislative Assembly was held in the spring of 1841.  There was no single election date.  The returning officer in each electoral district chose the date for the election in their district.

The Governor General, following the policy of assimilation set out in Lord Durham's Report, drew boundaries and chose the location of polling stations in Canada East in anglophone areas, in an effort to favour voters of British stock and to make it more difficult for francophone voters to exercise their franchise.

There was electoral violence during the elections.  In one case, the threat of riots at the polling station forced Louis-Hippolyte Lafontaine, a proponent of responsible government, to withdraw his candidacy from the riding of Terrebonne in Canada East.  In response, Robert Baldwin in Canada West, also a supporter of responsible government, proposed to his father, William Warren Baldwin, that they should assist Lafontaine's election.  Baldwin senior was a candidate for a riding in the Toronto area.  He withdrew his nomination to allow Lafontaine to stand for election.  Lafontaine was elected.  This was the beginning of the Lafontaine-Baldwin alliance which ultimately led to responsible government in the Province of Canada.

Candidates at this time would be loosely affiliated in early political parties, but party structure was not strong, and there were different party groups in Canada East and Canada West.  The election resulted in a Legislative Assembly with no single party group with a majority.

Governors General

One of the unusual features of the 1st Parliament was the high turnover in the position of governor general.  Charles Poulett Thomson was the governor general from February 1841 until September 1841, when he died from tetanus resulting from a riding accident.  His deputy, Major-General John Clitherow, immediately prorogued Parliament.  Clitherow was replaced by the Administrator, Lieutenant-General Sir Richard Downes Jackson, shortly afterwards.  Jackson acted as Administrator until January 1842, when Sir Charles Bagot was appointed Governor General.  Bagot resigned the office in March, 1843 due to ill health, dying shortly afterwards.  Sir Charles Metcalfe then took over, and stayed in office until November 1845.  He retired to England and died of cancer shortly afterwards.

Legislative Assembly

Canada East

Members elected in the general election 
The following members were elected to the Legislative Assembly from Canada East in the 1841 general election.<ref name=Return>[https://www.canadiana.ca/view/oocihm.9_00952_1/13?r=0&s=4 "Return of the names of the Members chosen to serve in the Legislative Assembly of Canada", Office of the Clerk of the Crown in Chancery, Kingston, 14th. June, 1841, Journals of the Legislative Assembly of the Province of Canada, 1st Parliament, 1st Session, 1841, pp. xi–xii.]</ref>

 Vacancies during the First Parliament 

 By-elections during the First Parliament 

The following members were elected in by-elections during the First Parliament.

 Canada West 

 Members elected in the general election 
The following members were elected to the Legislative Assembly from Canada West in the 1841 general election.

 Vacancies during the First Parliament 

 By-elections and election petitions during the First Parliament 

The following members were elected in by-elections during the First Parliament, or installed as a result of election petitions challenging an election.

 References 

 Bibliography 
 Cornell, P.G., Underhill, F.H., Brown G.W., and Careless J.M.S., Upper Canadian politics in the 1850s'', (Toronto:  University of Toronto Press, 1967).

External links 

 A History of the Vote in Canada (2nd edition)

01